Juan Arcocha (November 7, 1927 – May 7, 2010) was a Cuban journalist and writer.

Biography 
Juan Arcocha, born in Santiago de Cuba in 1927, was a Cuban journalist and writer active in the late 20th century. Arcocha was an initial supporter of the Cuban Revolution, working as a correspondent for the communist newspaper Revolución in Moscow in the 1960s. He broke ties with the regime over the unfair incarceration of Cuban political prisoner Heberto Padilla, exiling himself to Paris in 1971.

In addition to his prolific literary work, Arcocha served as an interpreter throughout his career, facilitating the meeting between Cuban communist officials and Jean-Paul Sartre and Simone de Beauvoir during the philosophers’ visit to Havana in 1960. He would eventually work as an interpreter for the United Nations and its Educational, Scientific and Cultural Organization (UNESCO), as well as acting as the press attaché for the Cuban Embassy in Paris. He died in Paris on May 7, 2010.

Works or publications

Notes and references

External links
 The Juan Arcocha papers are available at the Cuban Heritage Collection, University of Miami Libraries.

1927 births
2010 deaths
Cuban journalists
Male journalists
Exiles of the Cuban Revolution in France
Cuban male writers